, South Korean low-cost airline Jeju Air flies to the following destinations:

External links

References

Lists of airline destinations